Gonbaki Rural District is a rural district (dehestan) in Gonbaki District, Rigan County, Kerman Province, Iran. At the 2006 census, its population was 11,926, in 2,554 families. The rural district has 33 villages.

References 

Rural Districts of Kerman Province
Rigan County